This is a list of hospitals in Alabama (U.S. state), sorted by hospital name.

Hospitals
The American Hospital Directory lists 126 hospitals in Alabama.

Defunct Hospitals

References

External links
 Alabama Hospital Association
 Alabama Trauma Centers
 Alabama • Hospitals & Medical Centers • AL

Alabama
 
Hospitals